Dongcheon Station is a metro station located in Dongcheon-dong, Suji-gu, Yongin, Gyeonggi-do, South Korea. It is located right next to the Gyeongbu Expressway and riders can immediately transfer to a bus on the highway via a bus transfer stop located directly at Exit 1.

Frequent riders from Dongcheon Station to Pangyo Station can claim a cashback once they fill discounts of 200 won for every ride until 5000 won, when it can be claimed.

Through Sinbundang subway, it takes only 22 minutes from Dongcheon Station to Gangnam Station.(According to Kakao Map)

Adjacent station

D13 Miguem Station  - Dongcheon Station - D15 Suji-gu office Station

The vicinity of the station

Orion Resin Logistics Center

Headquarter and Yongin Plant of Solar Drugs

Korea Highway Corporation Korea Express Bus EX Hub Transfer Station

(Note) Pokémon Korea

Dongcheon Station Bus Station

Jukjeon Maksan Apartment Complex 1

Jukjeon Maksan Apartment Complex 2

Jukjeon Maksan Apartment Complex 3

Jukjeon Maksan Apartment Complex 4

Dongcheon Village Hyundai Homestown Primary

Dongcheon Village Hyundai Homestown Secondary

Dongmakcheon

U-Tower

The structure of the station

The platform has a two-sided, two-way, relative platform and a screen door.

References

Seoul Metropolitan Subway stations
Metro stations in Yongin
Railway stations opened in 2016